Paradol is the active flavor constituent of the seeds of Guinea pepper (Aframomum melegueta or grains of paradise).  It is also found in ginger.  Paradol has been found to have antioxidant and antitumor promoting effects in a mouse model.

It is used in flavors as an essential oil to give spiciness.

See also 
 Gingerol
 Shogaol

References 

Phenol antioxidants
Pungent flavors